Campylopetalum is a monotypic genus of shrubs (specifically suffrutex) in the subfamily Anacardioideae of the cashew and sumac family Anacardiaceae. It contains the single species Campylopetalum siamense, which is endemic to northern Thailand.

References

Anacardiaceae
Endemic flora of Thailand
Monotypic Sapindales genera
Anacardiaceae genera